Coleby is a village and civil parish in the North Kesteven district of Lincolnshire, England.

Village
Coleby, a documented settlement in Domesday, being in the Parts of Kesteven. Coleby is set on the Lincoln Cliff escarpment with views over the River Witham valley  from its western side. Coleby's population is approximately 600, falling to 410 at the 2011 census.

Coleby has two village public houses, The Bell situated close to the church, and the Tempest Arms which stands at the top of the road that leads up the hill from the valley. The village has small school typically consisting of below 100 pupils.

Landmarks

Church of All Saints
Coleby Grade I listed Anglican parish church is dedicated to All Saints. The original church was built by the Anglo-Saxons, extended by the Normans and had a new spire built on top of the Saxon tower in the Middle Ages. There is a lack of symmetry to the chancel, the arches on the north and south walls do not match and half of an arch has been stopped off. The church was extensively restored in 1900. On the church steeple are landing lights for the nearby RAF Waddington airbase.

Coleby Hall
It is a gabled house constructed in coursed rubble and ashlar with a red-tiled ridge roof, built in 1628 for Sir William Lister of Rippingale, the father of Thomas Lister.

The hall descended via Thomas Lister, MP, who extended the hall and then to his great niece Frances Lister in 1734, who had married Thomas Scrope. Thomas altered and further extended the hall and in 1762 built in the grounds a folly of a Temple to Romulus and Remus (now grade I listed) and a gateway to the Hall as an imitation ruined Roman arch based on Newport Arch in Lincoln. Ownership passed to the Tempest family in 1856 who made major alterations to the hall and estate before selling it on. It was later bought by the Fowkes family, and apart from being requisitioned by the military during the Second World War, remained in their possession until 1981, when it was sold to property developers.

RAF Coleby Grange

During the Second World War, the Ministry of Defence constructed an airfield at RAF Coleby Grange to the east of the village on open heathland, immediately west of the A15 road. It opened in 1939 with grass runways as a relief landing ground for RAF Cranwell. In May 1941 it was transferred to 12 Group, RAF Fighter Command and became a satellite station for RAF Digby.
 
The station re-opened in 1959 as a Thor IRBM launching base, it closed again in 1963. Today the airfield is in private hands and used for agriculture with only the Control Tower, which still stands although in a ruined state, as a visible sign of the station's existence.

References

Further reading
 Halpenny, Bruce Barrymore, Action Stations: Wartime Military Airfields of Lincolnshire and the East Midlands v. 2.

External links

"Coleby Hall", Lincolnshire.gov.uk. Retrieved 10 July 2013

Villages in Lincolnshire
Civil parishes in Lincolnshire
North Kesteven District